Live is the second release by the nu metal music group Five.Bolt.Main. The live album was released on October 10, 2006 via Rock Ridge Music. The album features one unreleased song ("Just My Luck") and a cover version of the Flaw track "Only the Strong". The album was recorded at a performance in the band's hometown of Louisville, Kentucky (2006).

Track listing
 "Slip"  – 3:43
 "Pathetic"  – 4:02
 "The Gift"  – 2:52
 "Seem to Be Fine"  – 4:00
 "Just My Luck"  – 3:56
 "What You Are"  – 3:26
 "Broken Compass"  – 3:44
 "Only the Strong" (Flaw cover) – 4:21
 "Made Like This"  – 3:45
 "Wait in Line"  – 4:28
 "Breathing" - 3:34

2006 live albums
Rock Ridge Music live albums
Five.Bolt.Main albums